The 2016 Chinese Football Association Division Two League season was the 27th season since its establishment in 1989. It was divided into two groups, North and South. The league was expanded to 20 teams, with 10 teams in North Group and 10 teams in South Group.

Team changes

To League Two 
Teams relegated from 2015 China League One
 Beijing BIT
 Jiangxi Liansheng

Teams entered from 2015 China Amateur Football League 
 Suzhou Dongwu
 Hainan Seamen
 Shenzhen Renren
 Shenyang City

From League Two 
Teams promoted to 2016 China League One
 Meizhou Kejia 
 Dalian Transcendence

Name changes 
 Hainan Seamen F.C. changed their name to Hainan Boying & Seamen F.C. in December 2015.
 Nanjing Qianbao F.C. moved to the city of Chengdu and changed their name to Chengdu Qbao F.C. in January 2016.
 Yunnan Wanhao F.C. moved to the city of Shanghai and changed their name to Shanghai JuJu Sports F.C. in January 2016.
 Meixian Hakka F.C. changed their name to Meizhou Meixian Hakka F.C. in January 2016.
 Shenyang City F.C. changed their name to Shenyang Urban F.C. in March 2016.

Other changes 
 Jiangsu Yancheng Dingli F.C. took over the place of Fujian Broncos F.C. in January 2016.
 Heilongjiang Lava Spring F.C. took over the place of Anhui Litian F.C. in January 2016.
 Nantong Zhiyun F.C. took over the place of Guangxi Longguida F.C. in January 2016.

Clubs

Clubs and locations

Clubs Locations

Managerial changes

League table

North Group

South Group

Overall table

Group stage results

North Group

South Group

Play-offs

Nineteenth place match

|}

First leg

Second leg

Seventeenth Place Match

|}

First leg

Second leg

Fifteenth Place Match

|}

First leg

Second leg

Thirteenth Place Match

|}

First leg

Second leg

Eleventh Place Match

|}

First leg

Second leg

Ninth Place Match

|}

First leg

Second leg

Quarter-finals

|}

First leg

Second leg

Sichuan Longfor won 3–2 on aggregate.

Lijiang Jiayunhao won 4–2 on aggregate.

Baoding Yingli ETS won 3–1 on aggregate.

Jiangxi Liansheng won 3–1 on aggregate.

Semi-finals

|}

First leg

Second leg

1–1 on aggregate. Lijiang Jiayunhao won 2–1 on penalties.

3–3 on aggregate. Baoding Yingli ETS won on away goals.

Third-Place Match

Final Match

Top scorers
{| class="wikitable"
|-
!Rank
!Player
!Club
!Total
|-
!rowspan=1|
| Zhang Shuang
|Baoding Yingli ETS
|
|-
!rowspan=1|
| Tan Tiancheng
|Yinchuan Helanshan
|
|-
!rowspan=3|
| Han Zilong
|Hebei Elite
|
|-
| Yang Jian
|Shenyang Urban
|
|-
| Yan Peng
|Shenyang Urban
|
|-
!rowspan=3|
| Fan Zhiqiang
|Jiangxi Liansheng
|
|-
| Yang Zi
|Lijiang Jiayunhao
|
|-
| Zhu Yifan
|Jiangxi Liansheng
|
|-
!rowspan=4|
| Liu Yang
|Meizhou Meixian Hakka
|
|-
| Shi Jun
|Hebei Elite
|
|-
| Wang Ziming
|Heilongjiang Lava Spring
|
|-
| Yang Wanshun
|Jiangsu Yancheng Dingli
|
|-

Awards
The awards of 2016 China League Two were announced on 11 November 2016.
 Most valuable player:  Zhang Shuang (Baoding Yingli ETS)
 Golden Boot:  Zhang Shuang (Baoding Yingli ETS)
 Best goalkeeper:  Wen Zhixiang (Jiangxi Liansheng)
 Young Player of the Year:  Zhang Xingbo (Meizhou Meixian Hakka)
 Best coach:  Zhang Biao (Lijiang Jiayunhao)
 Fair play award: Yinchuan Helanshan, Meizhou Meixian Hakka, Shenzhen Renren, Shanghai JuJu Sports, Shenyang Urban
 Best referee:  Yang Delin,  Dai Yige,  Zhang Meilin

Attendance

Note:
† Teams played previous season in CL1.
‡ Teams played previous season in CAL.
Source: 同道DATA, 同道DATA

References

External links
Official site 
News and results at mytiyu.cn 

3
China League Two seasons